To a Man with a Big Nose is a 3D animated short film by Cecilia Aranovich, based on a poem by Spanish author Francisco de Quevedo. It is in essence a visual adaptation of Quevedo's sonnet. Quevedo is officially credited for the film's script.

The film was selected for Best Animation at the 2006 Fargo Film Festival.

References

American animated short films
Films directed by Cecilia Aranovich